Ahercostomus is a genus of flies in the family Dolichopodidae. It currently contains only one species, Ahercostomus jiangchenganus, known only from China. Ahercostomus was originally created as a subgenus of Hercostomus; it was later promoted to genus rank by Zhang & Yang (2005).

The specific name refers to the type locality, Jiangcheng, which is located in the Yunnan province of China.

References 

Dolichopodidae genera
Dolichopodinae
Monotypic Diptera genera
Diptera of Asia